Hucal is a department of La Pampa Province (Argentina).

References 

Departments of La Pampa Province